Delafield is an unincorporated community in Dahlgren Township, Hamilton County, Illinois, United States.

History
Delafield was founded in 1872 when the railroad was extended to that point. A post office was established at Delafield in 1872, and remained in operation until 1953.

References

Unincorporated communities in Hamilton County, Illinois
Unincorporated communities in Illinois